Koyyalagudem is a mandal in West Godavari district of the Indian state of Andhra Pradesh. Koyyalagudem comes under Jangareddygudem revenue division.

Koyyalagudem comes under Polavaram (ST) (Assembly constituency) and Eluru (Lok Sabha constituency).
Koyyalagudem is 49 km away from Rajahmundry, 67 km away from Eluru, the district headquarters and 36 km away from Polavaram.

Villages under koyyalagudem mandal are koyyalagudem,Ponguturu, 
Bayyanagudem,gavaravaram, kanapuram, Rajavaram, yerampeta
these villages are main villages in koyyalagudem mandal

Koyyalagudem mandal is one of the 46 mandals in the West Godavari district of the Indian state of Andhra Pradesh.[2] It is administered under the Kovvur revenue division.[2]

Villages 
	Villages	Administrative Division	Population
1)	Bayyanagudem	Koyyalagudem	Population = 9,398

2)	Chopparamannagudem
	Koyyalagudem Population = 	1,437

3)	Dippakayalapadu	Koyyalagudem	 
Population =  5,408

4)	Eduvadalapalem	Koyyalagudem	 
Population =  1,228

5)	Gavaravaram	Koyyalagudem	 
Population =   4,141

6)	Kanakadripuram	Koyyalagudem	 
Population =  361

7)	Kannapuram	Koyyalagudem	 
Population =   5,977

8)	Kannayagudem	Koyyalagudem	 
Population =  778

9)	Kuntalagudem	Koyyalagudem	 
Population =  905

10)	Mahadevapuram	Koyyalagudem	 
Population =  99

11)	Mangapathidevipeta	 
Population =  Koyyalagudem	2,244

12)	koyyalagudem	Koyyalagudem	 
Population =  22,300

13)	Ponguturu	Koyyalagudem	 
Population =  9,298

14)	Rajavaram	Koyyalagudem	
Population = 
6,443

15)	Ramanujapuram	Koyyalagudem	 
Population = 2079 
16)	Saripalle	Koyyalagudem	 
Population =  3,521

17)	Vedanthapuram	Koyyalagudem	 
Population =  2,149

18)	Yerrampeta	Koyyalagudem	Population = 3,496

Geography
It has an average elevation of 74 metres (246 ft).

References

Villages in West Godavari district